Cook Islands Cup is the top knockout tournament of the Cook Islands Football Association in Cook Islands.

Cook Islands Cup winners

1950: Titikaveka
1951–77: Unknown
1978: Tupapa Maraerenga
1979: Titikaveka
1980: Matavera
1981: Avatiu
1982: Avatiu
1983: Nikao Sokattack
1984: Titikaveka
1985: Arorangi
1986–90: Unknown
1991: Takuvaine
1992: Avatiu
1993: Avatiu
1994: Avatiu
1995: Avatiu
1996: Avatiu
1997: Avatiu
1998: Teau-o-Tonga
1998–99: Tupapa Maraerenga
1999–00: Tupapa Maraerenga
2000: Avatiu
2001: Tupapa Maraerenga
2002: Nikao Sokattack
2003: Nikao Sokattack
2004: Tupapa Maraerenga
2005: Nikao Sokattack
2006: Takuvaine
2007: Nikao Sokattack
2008: Nikao Sokattack
2009: Tupapa Maraerenga
2010: Nikao Sokattack
2011: Nikao Sokattack
2012: Nikao Sokattack
2013: Tupapa Maraerenga
2014: Takuvaine
2015: Tupapa Maraerenga
2016: Puaikura
2017: Puaikura
2018: Tupapa Maraerenga
2019: Tupapa Maraerenga
2020: Nikao Sokattack
2021: Nikao Sokattack
2022: Nikao Sokattack

Titles

See also
 Cook Islands Round Cup

References

Football competitions in the Cook Islands
National association football cups
Recurring sporting events established in 1950
1950 establishments in the Cook Islands